The 1982 Miami Hurricanes baseball team represented the University of Miami in the 1982 NCAA Division I baseball season. The team was coached by Ron Fraser in his 20th season.

The Hurricanes won the College World Series, defeating the Wichita State Shockers in the championship game.

Roster

Schedule 

! style="background:#F47320;color:#004F2F;"| Regular Season
|- 

|- align="center" bgcolor="ddffdd"
| February 5 ||  || Mark Light Field || 10–2 || 1–0
|- align="center" bgcolor="ddffdd"
| February 6 || California || Mark Light Field || 8–1 || 2–0
|- align="center" bgcolor="ddffdd"
| February 7 || California || Mark Light Field || 10–4 || 3–0
|- align="center" bgcolor="ddffdd"
| February 11 ||  || Mark Light Field || 3–1 || 4–0
|- align="center" bgcolor="ffdddd"
| February 12 || Seton Hall || Mark Light Field || 13–14 || 4–1
|- align="center" bgcolor="ddffdd"
| February 13 ||  || Mark Light Field || 7–3 || 5–1
|- align="center" bgcolor="ddffdd"
| February 14 || Florida || Mark Light Field || 6–2 || 6–1
|- align="center" bgcolor="ddffdd"
| February 15 || Seton Hall || Mark Light Field || 7–2 || 7–1
|- align="center" bgcolor="ddffdd"
| February 18 ||  || Mark Light Field || 7–1 || 8–1
|- align="center" bgcolor="ddffdd"
| February 19 ||  || Mark Light Field || 17–4 || 9–1
|- align="center" bgcolor="ffdddd"
| February 20 || North Carolina || Mark Light Field || 5–6 || 9–2
|- align="center" bgcolor="ddffdd"
| February 21 || North Carolina || Mark Light Field || 14–4 || 10–2
|- align="center" bgcolor="ddffdd"
| February 22 ||  || Mark Light Field || 15–8 || 11–2
|- align="center" bgcolor="ddffdd"
| February 23 || Mercer || Mark Light Field || 10–2 || 12–2
|- align="center" bgcolor="ddffdd"
| February 24 || Mercer || Mark Light Field || 9–0 || 13–2
|- align="center" bgcolor="ddffdd"
| February 26 ||  || Mark Light Field || 9–6 || 14–2
|- align="center" bgcolor="ffdddd"
| February 27 || New Orleans || Mark Light Field || 4–5 || 14–3
|- align="center" bgcolor="ffdddd"
| February 27 || New Orleans || Mark Light Field || 6–10 || 14–4
|-

|- align="center" bgcolor="ffdddd"
| March 3 ||  || Mark Light Field || 6–10 || 14–5
|- align="center" bgcolor="ddffdd"
| March 5 ||  || Mark Light Field || 18–4 || 15–5
|- align="center" bgcolor="ddffdd"
| March 6 || at  || Red McEwen Field || 14–6 || 16–5
|- align="center" bgcolor="ddffdd"
| March 9 || Biscayne || Mark Light Field || 13–1 || 17–5
|- align="center" bgcolor="ddffdd"
| March 12 ||  || Mark Light Field || 2–1 || 18–5
|- align="center" bgcolor="ddffdd"
| March 13 || South Carolina || Mark Light Field || 4–3 || 19–5
|- align="center" bgcolor="ddffdd"
| March 14 || South Carolina || Mark Light Field || 8–6 || 20–5
|- align="center" bgcolor="ddffdd"
| March 15 || South Carolina || Mark Light Field || 4–3 || 21–5
|- align="center" bgcolor="ddffdd"
| March 16 ||  || Mark Light Field || 12–0 || 22–5
|- align="center" bgcolor="ddffdd"
| March 17 ||  || Mark Light Field || 10–4 || 23–5
|- align="center" bgcolor="ddffdd"
| March 18 || George Washington || Mark Light Field || 16–2 || 24–5
|- align="center" bgcolor="ddffdd"
| March 19 ||  || Mark Light Field || 15–2 || 25–5
|- align="center" bgcolor="ddffdd"
| March 20 || Lewis || Mark Light Field || 9–2 || 26–5
|- align="center" bgcolor="ddffdd"
| March 21 ||  || Mark Light Field || 17–7 || 27–5
|- align="center" bgcolor="ddffdd"
| March 22 || Bowling Green || Mark Light Field || 14–1 || 28–5
|- align="center" bgcolor="ddffdd"
| March 24 || Bowling Green || Mark Light Field || 12–0 || 29–5
|- align="center" bgcolor="ddffdd"
| March 26 || at  || Seminole Field || 6–5 || 30–5
|- align="center" bgcolor="ffdddd"
| March 27 || at Florida State || Seminole Field || 3–5 || 30–6
|- align="center" bgcolor="ffdddd"
| March 28 || at Florida State || Seminole Field || 3–9 || 30–7
|- align="center" bgcolor="ffdddd"
| March 31 || Florida International || Mark Light Field || 1–2 || 30–8
|-

|- align="center" bgcolor="ffdddd"
| April 1 ||  || Mark Light Field || 9–11 || 3-–9
|- align="center" bgcolor="ddffdd"
| April 2 || South Florida || Mark Light Field || 5–4 || 31–9
|- align="center" bgcolor="ddffdd"
| April 3 || South Florida || Mark Light Field || 15–5 || 32–9
|- align="center" bgcolor="ddffdd"
| April 4 || at Florida International ||  || 13–12 || 33–9
|- align="center" bgcolor="ddffdd"
| April 8 ||  || Mark Light Field || 3–2 || 34–9
|- align="center" bgcolor="ddffdd"
| April 9 || Stetson || Mark Light Field || 14–7 || 35–9
|- align="center" bgcolor="ffdddd"
| April 10 || Stetson || Mark Light Field || 2–4 || 35–10
|- align="center" bgcolor="ffdddd"
| April 11 || at Florida International ||  || 0–5 || 35–11
|- align="center" bgcolor="ddffdd"
| April 14 || at South Carolina || Sarge Frye Field || 11–3 || 36–11
|- align="center" bgcolor="ddffdd"
| April 15 || at South Carolina || Sarge Frye Field || 12–8 || 37–11
|- align="center" bgcolor="ffdddd"
| April 16 || at South Carolina || Sarge Frye Field || 2–6 || 37–12
|- align="center" bgcolor="ddffdd"
| April 17 || at South Carolina || Sarge Frye Field || 19–3 || 38–12
|- align="center" bgcolor="ffdddd"
| April 18 || at  || Perry Field || 2–6 || 38–13
|- align="center" bgcolor="ddffdd"
| April 19 || at Florida || Perry Field || 8–7 || 39–13
|- align="center" bgcolor="ddffdd"
| April 22 ||  || Mark Light Field || 7–2 || 40–13
|- align="center" bgcolor="ddffdd"
| April 30 || Florida International || Mark Light Field || 6–2 || 41–13
|-

|- align="center" bgcolor="ddffdd"
| May 6 || Florida Atlantic || Mark Light Field || 4–3 || 42–13
|- align="center" bgcolor="ddffdd"
| May 7 || Florida State || Mark Light Field || 11–5 || 43–13
|- align="center" bgcolor="ffdddd"
| May 8 || Florida State || Mark Light Field || 2–9 || 43–14
|- align="center" bgcolor="ddddff"
| May 9 || Florida State || Mark Light Field || 7–7 || 43–14–1
|- align="center" bgcolor="ffdddd"
| May 11 || at  || Mark Light Field || 5–6 || 43–15–1
|- align="center" bgcolor="ddffdd"
| May 12 || at Georgia Southern || Mark Light Field || 14–5 || 44–15–1
|- align="center" bgcolor="ddffdd"
| May 14 || at  || Rose Bowl Field || 10–7 || 45–15–1
|- align="center" bgcolor="ddffdd"
| May 15 || at Georgia Tech || Rose Bowl Field || 13–3 || 46–15–1
|- align="center" bgcolor="ddffdd"
| May 21 || at  || Packard Stadium || 8–6 || 47–15–1
|- align="center" bgcolor="ffdddd"
| May 22 || at Arizona State || Packard Stadium || 1–3 || 47–16–1
|- align="center" bgcolor="ffdddd"
| May 23 || at Arizona State || Packard Stadium || 7–8 || 47–17–1
|-

|-
! style="background:#F47320;color:#004F2F;"| Post–Season
|-

|- align="center" bgcolor="ddffdd"
| May 29 || vs. Stetson || Mark Light Field || 18–2 || 48–17–1
|- align="center" bgcolor="ddffdd"
| May 29 || vs. South Florida || Mark Light Field || 9–4 || 49–17–1
|- align="center" bgcolor="ddffdd"
| May 30 || vs. Stetson || Mark Light Field || 15–3 || 50–17–1
|-

|- align="center" bgcolor="ddffdd"
| June 4 || vs.  || Rosenblatt Stadium || 7–2 || 51–17–1
|- align="center" bgcolor="ddffdd"
| June 7 || vs. Wichita State || Rosenblatt Stadium || 4–3 || 52–17–1
|- align="center" bgcolor="ddffdd"
| June 10 || vs. Texas || Rosenblatt Stadium || 2–1 || 53–17–1
|- align="center" bgcolor="ddffdd"
| June 11 || vs. Maine || Rosenblatt Stadium || 10–4 || 54–17–1
|- align="center" bgcolor="ddffdd"
| June 12 || vs. Wichita State || Rosenblatt Stadium || 9–3 || 55–17–1
|-

Awards and honors 
Phil Lane
 College World Series All-Tournament Team

Nelson Santovenia
 College World Series All-Tournament Team

Danny Smith
 College World Series Most Outstanding Player
 All-America First Team

Hurricanes in the 1982 MLB Draft 
The following members of the Miami baseball program were drafted in the 1982 Major League Baseball Draft.

References 

Miami Hurricanes
Miami Hurricanes baseball seasons
College World Series seasons
NCAA Division I Baseball Championship seasons
Miami Hurricanes baseball team